Giovanni Boggi (died 1832) was an Italian engraver and painter, in his artistic prime in the 1820s. Several of his works are on display at the Bibliothèque Nationale, Paris. He was especially noted for his portraits of important Greek people, particularly from the War of Greek Independence, including  Markos Botsaris, a Souliote captain, and Theodoros Kolokotronis (1825). He also made portraits of Francesco Algarotti and Luigi Lanzi.

Gallery

References

External links

Italian engravers
19th-century Italian painters
Italian male painters
1832 deaths
18th-century births
19th-century Italian male artists